Modliborzyce may refer to several places:
Modliborzyce, Kuyavian-Pomeranian Voivodeship (north-central Poland)
Modliborzyce, Lublin Voivodeship (east Poland)
Modliborzyce, Świętokrzyskie Voivodeship (south-central Poland)
 Modliborzyce Commune